Mount Colah railway station is located on the Main Northern line, serving the Mount Colah suburb of Sydney, Australia. It is served by Sydney Trains T1 North Shore Line services and some early morning and late night NSW TrainLink Central Coast & Newcastle Line services.

History
Mount Colah station opened on 1 July 1887 as Colah. It was renamed Mount Colah on 6 May 1906.

Platforms and services

Transport links
Transdev NSW operates three routes via Mount Colah station:
592: Hornsby station to Brooklyn and Mooney Mooney
595: Hornsby station to Arthurs Circle
597: Hornsby station to Berowra station and Berowra Heights

References

External links

Mount Colah station details Transport for New South Wales

Railway stations in Sydney
Railway stations in Australia opened in 1887
Short-platform railway stations in New South Wales, 6 cars
Hornsby Shire
Main North railway line, New South Wales